The Entabeni Game Reserve, Entabeni means 'place of the mountain', is a  private reserve situated in the Waterberg in Limpopo Province in northern South Africa. The Entabeni Reserve is popular for safari trips because of the opportunity to see big game and a variety of birds and antelope species, as well as its scenery, and the fact that it is in a malaria-free zone. The reserve is home to lion, African bush elephant, South African giraffe, African leopard, South African cheetah, warthog, African buffalo, hippopotamus and other safari animals in a variety of habitats.

The reserve is owned and operated by Legend Lodges.

Also situated on the property is the Entabeni Nature Guide Training school.

References

External links
http://www.legendlodges.co.za
http://www.natureguidetraining.co.za
http://www.legendgolfsafari.com

Protected areas of Limpopo